The academic dress of China has a long history. The ancient dress is based on the robes of officialdom and the 'degrees' were earned through the imperial civil service examinations, while the modern dress is partially influenced by the  Western (more so United States) academic dress. Ancient China consisted of official dress. Official dress was used to represent an official in society and a scholar at the same time.

History
Since Chinese academia was more or less connected with officialdom, the academic dress of ancient China is essentially that of official dress. Other dynasties had similar dress with their own take on it, but they basically follow the same pattern and are distinctive from common dress.

Qin Dynasty 
Starting from Tang Dynasty, the official robes were divided into colors, depending on both position and grade. “Officials with high positions and low grades are still dressed according to the original products.” The six kinds of coronal clothing were abolished after Qin Shihuang unified the whole country, except for the black Xuanmian that would serve for sacrificial purposes. During the Qin dynasty everyone, from emperor to civilians, wore black for one very specific and unique reason. They believed that they were “in line with the water virtue, according to the five elements theory, and that water was in harmony with black.” Since Qin destroyed the old ritual system, there were no uniforms left in the early Han dynasty. Being that said the official robes of Han Dynasty were simply robes. Since they all wore the same official uniforms, the only thing distinguishing the officials are the crowns, since they are different.

Tang Dynasty 
From “618 to 907”, official and academic dressing consisted of “panling lanshan”. This was a “long, red, round-collar robe with long sleeves”. Such an outfit was worn with “putout, which had a “curved brocade brim”. Tang Dynasty lead a standard of official and academic uniforms for the periods after Tang Dynasty.

Song dynasty 
During the Song Dynasty the official uniforms were a little different. They were simple but in a way that they looked clean and capable. These uniforms were also graded by color. The official uniforms of the song dynasty had a great feature, especially compared with those of other Chinese dynasties, that is, they appeared simple, simple, with simple lines, and looked fresh, clean and capable. The official uniforms of the song dynasty were also graded by color: purple belongs to more than three, vermilion is more than five, green is more than seven, and lastly, cyan was only used by nine product sesame officials.

Yuan dynasty 
There was racial discrimination during the Yuan Dynasty, and for that reason there were strict rules to follow when it comes to clothing. There were two basic types of clothing in the yuan dynasty: one was the clothing of the Mongolian ethnic group, whom usually have a small lock of hair on their foreheads, like a peach, and the rest are braided into two braids, which are then twisted into two large loops and hung behind their ears, with hats on their heads. And the second one was clothing of the Han ethnic group.

The regular service, or civil service system of all officials, was the most typical and probably the most important civil service system during the Yuan and the Han Dynasties.

Ancient China consisted of official dress. Official dresses were used as medium to represent an official in society and a scholar at the same time.

Ming Dynasty 
 
“Empire of Great Ming dated from 1368 to 1644”. In this period it was the accessory- hat that defined the “role and status of scholars and literati (scholar-bureaucrats or scholar officials)”.

Transition towards the West 
It was however after the “1911 Revolution of Sun Yat-sen”, that western ideas of academic uniform and academic hat perpetrated the Chinese Academic Dressing.

Modern Chinese academic dress

The current modernized academic dress of China is very different from the ancient form. The current forms have been standardized since 1994. Gowns are closed at the front and are colored depending on the level of the degree; typically, black for bachelors, blue for masters and a combination of scarlet and black for doctoral gowns. The hood is a simple piece of triangular cloth which is colored depending on the faculty. The mortarboard is similar to American ones, except they may have string at the back of the skullcap to tie and secure the cap to the head.

Officers' robes are typically all red (including the mortarboard) with three gold bands on the sleeves, similar to Thai academic dress.

See also
Hanfu
Academic dress
Imperial civil service examination

References

External links
A list of articles on academic dress, including information on modern Chinese academic dress. 
Some pictures of examples of Chinese Academic dress. 

Academic dress
Chinese clothing
History of Asian clothing